Moi International Airport  is an international airport in Mombasa, the second-largest city in Kenya. In 2020, the airport was heralded as the "Best Airport in Africa" (with under 2 million passengers annually) by Airports Council International.

Overview
Moi International Airport serves the city of Mombasa and surrounding communities. Mombasa Airport is operated by Kenya Airports Authority. It was named after former Kenyan President Daniel arap Moi during his tenure.

Runway 1 is also known as Runway 03/21, while Runway 2 is also known as Runway 15/33. Runway 1 is equipped with an ILS (Instrument Landing System).

There are two terminals at the airport. Terminal 1 is primarily used for international flights, while Terminal 2 is used for domestic flights. Some airlines such as Kenya Airways use Terminal 1 for both domestic and international.

In September 2018, it was confirmed that Qatar Airways would be introducing four weekly flights to Mombasa operating with the A320. The first flight commenced on 11 December 2018, with a flight time from Doha of just over 6 hours.

History
The airport was built during the Second World War by the Engineer Corps of the South African Army. During the war, it was used by the Fleet Air Arm as a land base of the British Eastern Fleet which was based at nearby Kilindini Harbour from 1942, by the Royal Air Force (AHQ East Africa and No. 246 Wing RAF) which operated anti-submarine Catalina flying boats off the East Africa coast and by the South African Air Force which was engaged in the war against Italy in Abyssinia. It was originally known as Port Reitz Airport.

Mombasa Airport was expanded to an international airport in 1979. Aircraft Maintenance facilities for private and light- to medium-size commercial aircraft are provided from government and private hangars by Benair Aircraft Engineering, licensed by the Kenya Civil Aviation Authority (KCAA) as an approved maintenance organisation (AMO).

Benair Engineering constructed its first private aircraft maintenance hangar in 1997 as a temporary structure and it is still standing today. The hangar is located adjacent to the government hangar built to maintain Catalina aircraft during WW2 as part of the British East Africa war effort. Benair has been the principal aircraft maintenance facility since its inception at the Kenya coast and the name is based on the Chief engineer Geoffrey Benaglia. Principal customers include Dorenair, Dodsons International, Bluesky Aviation, Precision Air (Tanzania) and Mombasa Air Safari.

Starting on 18 August 1992, Moi International Airport was used as the headquarters for the US Central Command's regional command and control headquarters for Operation Provide Relief until 4 December of that same year when it was subordinated and merged with Operation Restore Hope. The initial deployment of personnel from US Central Command included tactical communications specialists from the Joint Communications Support Element (JCSE).

From July to September 1994, Moi International Airport was used almost continuously as a refueling station during the Operation Support Hope humanitarian mission into Rwanda. Empty C-141 and C-5 freighter jets returning to Europe flew to Mombasa due to the scarcity of fuel in the African interior. The airlift through Mombasa ceased by October due to runway expansion work.

Airlines and destinations

Note
: Condor' Frankfurt to Mombasa flights make a stop in Zanzibar. However, the airline does not have traffic rights to transport passengers solely between Zanzibar and Mombasa.

Statistics

References

External links

Location of Moi International Airport At Google Maps
Kenya Airports Authority – Moi International Airport
 – Mombasa Airport

Airports in Kenya
Buildings and structures in Mombasa
Coast Province
Mombasa County